Szabolcs is a given name. Notable people with the name include:

Szabolcs Balajcza (born 1979), Hungarian footballer
Szabolcs Fazakas (born 1947), Hungarian politician and Member of the European Parliament
Szabolcs Gál (born 1992), Hungarian footballer
Szabolcs Gyánó (born 1980), Hungarian footballer
Szabolcs Horváth (born 1989), Hungarian footballer
Szabolcs Huszti (born 1983), Hungarian footballer
Szabolcs Kókay (born 1976), Hungarian illustrator, wildlife artist and nature painter
Szabolcs Kanta (born 1982), Hungarian footballer
Szabolcs Kemenes (born 1986), Hungarian football player
Szabolcs Perenyi (born 1982), Romanian born Hungarian footballer
Szabolcs Sáfár (born 1974), Hungarian footballer 
Szabolcs Schimmer (born 1984), Hungarian footballer
Szabolcs Schindler (born 1974), Hungarian footballer
Szabolcs Székely (born 1985), Romanian footballer
Szabolcs Szőllősi (born 1986), Hungarian long track speed skater
Szabolcs Szegletes (born 1978), Hungarian footballer
Szabolcs Udvari (born 1974), Hungarian footballer
Szabolcs Vida, former Hungarian motorcycle speedway rider
Szabolcs Vidrai (born 1977), Hungarian figure skater

See also
Szabolcs (disambiguation)
Szabolcs (name), about the Hungarian surname

Hungarian masculine given names

eo:Szabolcs
hu:Szabolcs